Bern or Berne is the de facto capital of Switzerland, referred to as the "federal city". With a population of about 133,000, Bern is the fifth-most populous city in Switzerland, behind Zurich, Geneva, Basel and Lausanne. The Bern agglomeration, which includes 36 municipalities, had a population of 406,900 in 2014. The metropolitan area had a population of 660,000 in 2000.

Bern is also the capital of the canton of Bern, the second-most populous of Switzerland's cantons. The official language is German, but the main spoken language is the local variant of the Alemannic Swiss German dialect, Bernese German. In 1983, the historic old town (in ) in the centre of Bern became a UNESCO World Heritage Site. It is notably surrounded by the Aare, a major river of the Swiss Plateau.

Although fortified settlements were established since antiquity, the medieval city proper was founded by the Zähringer ruling family, probably in 1191 by Berthold V, Duke of Zähringen. Bern was made a free imperial city in 1218 and, in 1353, it joined the Swiss Confederacy, becoming one of its eight early cantons. Since then, Bern became a large city-state and a prominent actor of Swiss history by pursuing a policy of sovereign territorial expansion. Since the 15th century, the city was progressively rebuilt and acquired its current characteristics. Bern was made the Federal City in 1848. From about 5,000 inhabitants in the 15th century, the city passed the 100,000 mark in the 1920s.

Etymology 

The etymology of the name "Bern" is uncertain. According to the local legend, based on folk etymology, Berchtold V, Duke of Zähringen, the founder of the city of Bern, vowed to name the city after the first animal he met on the hunt, and this turned out to be a bear. It has long been considered likely that the city was named after the Italian city of Verona, which at the time was known as Bern in Middle High German. The city was sometimes referred to as Bern im Üechtland to distinguish it from Verona. As a result of the finding of the Bern zinc tablet in the 1980s, it is now more common to assume that the city was named after a pre-existing toponym of Celtic origin, possibly *berna "cleft". The bear was the heraldic animal of the seal and coat of arms of Bern from at least the 1220s. The earliest reference to the keeping of live bears in the Bärengraben dates to the 1440s.

History

Early history

No archaeological evidence that indicates a settlement on the site of today's city centre prior to the 12th century has been found so far. In antiquity, a Celtic oppidum stood on the Engehalbinsel (peninsula) north of Bern, fortified since the second century BC (late La Tène period), thought to be one of the 12 oppida of the Helvetii mentioned by Caesar. During the Roman era, a Gallo-Roman vicus was on the same site. The Bern zinc tablet has the name Brenodor ("dwelling of Breno").

The medieval city is a foundation of the Zähringer ruling family, which rose to power in Upper Burgundy in the 12th century. According to 14th-century historiography (Cronica de Berno, 1309), Bern was founded in 1191 by Berthold V, Duke of Zähringen.

In 1218, after Berthold died without an heir, Bern was made a free imperial city by the Goldene Handfeste of Holy Roman Emperor Frederick II.

Old Swiss Confederacy
In 1353, Bern joined the Swiss Confederacy, becoming one of the eight cantons of the formative period of 1353 to 1481.

Bern invaded and conquered Aargau in 1415 and Vaud in 1536, as well as other smaller territories, thereby becoming the largest city-state north of the Alps; by the 18th century, it comprised most of what is today the canton of Bern and the canton of Vaud.

The city grew out towards the west of the boundaries of the peninsula formed by the river Aare. The Zytglogge tower marked the western boundary of the city from 1191 until 1256, when the Käfigturm took over this role until 1345. It was, in turn, succeeded by the Christoffelturm (formerly located close to the site of the modern-day railway station) until 1622. During the time of the Thirty Years' War, two new fortifications – the so-called big and small Schanze (entrenchment) – were built to protect the whole area of the peninsula.

After a major blaze in 1405, the city's original wooden buildings were gradually replaced by half-timbered houses and subsequently the sandstone buildings which came to be characteristic for the Old Town. Despite the waves of pestilence that hit Europe in the 14th century, the city continued to grow, mainly due to immigration from the surrounding countryside.

Modern history

Bern was occupied by French troops in 1798 during the French Revolutionary Wars, when it was stripped of parts of its territories. It regained control of the Bernese Oberland in 1802, and following the Congress of Vienna of 1814, it newly acquired the Bernese Jura. At this time, it once again became the largest canton of the Confederacy as it stood during the Restoration and until the secession of the canton of Jura in 1979. Bern was made the Federal City (seat of the Federal Assembly) within the new Swiss federal state in 1848.

A number of congresses of the socialist First and Second Internationals were held in Bern, particularly during World War I when Switzerland was neutral; see Bern International.

The city's population rose from about 5,000 in the 15th century to about 12,000 by 1800 and to above 60,000 by 1900, passing the 100,000 mark during the 1920s. Population peaked during the 1960s at 165,000 and has since decreased slightly, to below 130,000 by 2000. As of September 2017, the resident population stood at 142,349, of which 100,000 were Swiss citizens and 42,349 (31%) resident foreigners. A further estimated 350,000 people live in the immediate urban agglomeration.

Geography and climate

Topography

The countryside around Bern was formed by glaciers during the most recent ice age.

The city was originally built on a hilly peninsula surrounded by the river Aare, but outgrew natural boundaries by the 19th century. A number of bridges have been built to allow the city to expand beyond the Aare.

Bern is built on very uneven ground. An elevation difference of up to 60 metres exists between the inner city districts on the Aare (Matte, Marzili) and the higher ones (Kirchenfeld, Länggasse).

Of this area,  or 18.2% is used for agricultural purposes, while  or 33.3% is forested.

Of the developed area of Bern, 3.1% consists of industrial buildings, 22.3% housing and other buildings, and 12.9% is devoted to transport infrastructure. Power and water infrastructure, as well as other special developed areas, made up 1.2% of the city, while another 6.5% consists of parks, green belts, and sports fields.

Of Bern's total land area, 32.8% is heavily forested. Of the agricultural land, 13.3% is used for growing crops and 4.4% is designated to be used as pasture. Local rivers and streams provide all the water in the municipality.

Climate
According to the Köppen Climate Classification, Bern has an oceanic climate (Cfb) closely bordering on a humid continental climate (Dfb).

Politics

Subdivisions
The municipality is administratively subdivided into six districts (Stadtteile), each of which consists of several quarters (Quartiere).

Government

The Municipal Council (de: Gemeinderat, fr: conseil municipal) constitutes the executive government of the City of Bern and operates as a collegiate authority. It is composed of five councillors, each presiding over a directorate (de: Direktion, fr: direction) comprising several departments and bureaus. The president of the executive department acts as mayor (de: Stadtpräsident, fr: Le Maire). In the mandate period 2021–2024 (Legislatur) the Municipal Council is presided by Stadtpräsident Alec von Graffenried. Departmental tasks, coordination measures and implementation of laws decreed by the City Council are carried by the Municipal Council. The regular election of the Municipal Council by any inhabitant valid to vote is held every four years. Any resident of Bern allowed to vote can be elected as a member of the Municipal Council. Contrary to most other municipalities, the executive government in Berne is selected by means of a system of Proporz. The mayor is elected as such as well by public election while the heads of the other directorates are assigned by the collegiate. The executive body holds its meetings in the Erlacherhof, built by architect Albrecht Stürler after 1747.

, Bern's Municipal Council is made up of two representatives of the SP (Social Democratic Party), and one each of CVP (Christian Democratic Party), GFL (Grüne Freie Liste a.k.a. Green Free List, who is the newly elected mayor since 2017), and GB (Green Alliance of Berne), giving the left parties a very strong majority of four out of five seats. The last regular election was held on 29 November 2020.

Dr. Jürg Wichtermann is State Chronicler (Staatsschreiber) since 2008. He has been elected by the collegiate.

Parliament

The City Council (de: Stadtrat, fr: Conseil de ville) holds legislative power. It is made up of 80 members, with elections held every four years. The City Council decrees regulations and by-laws that are executed by the Municipal Council and the administration. The delegates are selected by means of a system of proportional representation.

The sessions of the City Council are public. Unlike members of the Municipal Council, members of the City Council are not politicians by profession, and they are paid a fee based on their attendance. Any resident of Bern allowed to vote can be elected as a member of the City Council. The parliament holds its meetings in the Stadthaus (Town Hall).

The last regular election of the City Council was held on 29 November 2020 for the mandate period from 2021 to 2024. The City Council consist of 23 (-1) members of the Social Democratic Party (SP/PS) including two seats by the junior party JUSO, 11 (+3) Green Liberal Party (glp/pvl) including two member of its junior party jglp, 10 (+1) Green Alliance of Berne (GB), 8 (-1) The Liberals (FDP/PLR) including one seat by its junior partner JF / DL, 7 (-2) Swiss People's Party (SVP/UDC), 7 (-1) Grüne Freie Liste (GFL) (Green Free List), 3 (+1) Junge Alternative (JA!) (or Young Alternatives), 3 (+1) Alternative Linke Bern (AL), 2 (-1) Conservative Democratic Party (BDP/PBD), 2 (-) Christian Democratic People's Party (CVP/PDC), 2 (-) Evangelical People's Party (EVP/PEV), 1 (-) Swiss Party of Labour (PdA), and 1 Grüne alternative Partei (GaP) (or Green alternative Party).

National elections

National Council
In the 2019 federal election for the Swiss National Council the most popular party was the PS which received 28.7% (-5.6) of the vote. The next five most popular parties were the Green Party (25.2%, +7.9), the pvl (13.5%, +4.1), the UDC (9.5%, -2.9), PLR (4.2%, -2.8), and the BDP/PBD (7.0%). In the federal election a total of 49,030 votes were cast, and the voter turnout was 56%.

In the 2015 federal election for the Swiss National Council the most popular party was the PS which received 34.3% of the vote. The next five most popular parties were the Green Party (17.4%), the UDC (12.4%), and the FDP/PLR (9.9%), glp/pvl (9.4%), and the BDP/PBD (7.0%). In the federal election, a total of 48,556 voters were cast, and the voter turnout was 56.0%.

International relations

Twin and sister cities
The Municipal Council of the city of Bern decided against having twinned cities except for a temporary (during the UEFA Euro 2008) cooperation with the Austrian city Salzburg.

Demographics

Population

About 34% of the population are resident foreign nationals. Over the 10 years between 2000 and 2010, the population changed at a rate of 0.6%. Migration accounted for 1.3%, while births and deaths accounted for −2.1%.

Most of the population speaks German (104,465 or 81.2%) as their first language, Italian is the second most common (5,062 or 3.9%) and French is the third (4,671 or 3.6%). There are 171 people who speak Romansh.

, the population was 47.5% male and 52.5% female. The population was made up of 44,032 Swiss men (35.4% of the population) and 15,092 (12.1%) non-Swiss men. There were 51,531 Swiss women (41.4%) and 13,726 (11.0%) non-Swiss women. Of the population in the municipality, 39,008 or about 30.3% were born in Bern and lived there in 2000. There were 27,573 or 21.4% who were born in the same canton, while 25,818 or 20.1% were born somewhere else in Switzerland, and 27,812 or 21.6% were born outside of Switzerland.

, children and teenagers (0–19 years old) make up 15.1% of the population, while adults (20–64 years old) make up 65% and seniors (over 64 years old) make up 19.9%.

, there were 59,948 people who were single and never married in the municipality. There were 49,873 married individuals, 9,345 widows or widowers and 9,468 individuals who are divorced.

, there were 67,115 private households in the municipality, and an average of 1.8 persons per household. There were 34,981 households that consist of only one person and 1,592 households with five or more people. , a total of 65,538 apartments (90.6% of the total) were permanently occupied, while 5,352 apartments (7.4%) were seasonally occupied and 1,444 apartments (2.0%) were empty. , the construction rate of new housing units was 1.2 new units per 1000 residents.

 the average price to rent an average apartment in Bern was 1108.92 Swiss francs (CHF) per month (US$890, £500, €710 approx. exchange rate from 2003). The average rate for a one-room apartment was 619.82 CHF (US$500, £280, €400), a two-room apartment was about 879.36 CHF (US$700, £400, €560), a three-room apartment was about 1040.54 CHF (US$830, £470, €670) and a six or more room apartment cost an average of 2094.80 CHF (US$1680, £940, €1340). The average apartment price in Bern was 99.4% of the national average of 1116 CHF. The vacancy rate for the municipality, was 0.45%.

Historic population
The historical population is given in the following chart:

Religion
Of the rest of the population, there were 1,874 members of an Orthodox church (or about 1.46% of the population), there were 229 persons (or about 0.18% of the population) who belonged to the Christ Catholic Church, and there were 5,531 persons (or about 4.30% of the population) who belonged to another Christian religion. There were 324 persons (or about 0.25% of the population) who were Jewish, and 4,907 (or about 3.81% of the population) who were Muslim. There were 629 persons who were Buddhist, 1,430 persons who were Hindu and 177 persons who belonged to another religion. 16,363 (or about 12.72% of the population) belonged to no religion, are agnostic or atheist, and 7,855 persons (or about 6.11% of the population) did not answer the question. On 14 December 2014 the Haus der Religionen was inaugurated.

Main sights

The structure of Bern's city centre is largely medieval and has been recognised by UNESCO as a Cultural World Heritage Site. Perhaps its most famous sight is the Zytglogge (Bernese German for "Time Bell"), an elaborate medieval clock tower with moving puppets. It also has an impressive 15th century Gothic cathedral, the Münster, and a 15th-century town hall.

Since the 16th century, the city has had a bear pit, the Bärengraben, at the far end of the Nydeggbrücke to house its heraldic animals. The four bears are now kept in an open-air enclosure nearby, and two other young bears, a present by the Russian president, are kept in Dählhölzli zoo.

The Federal Palace (Bundeshaus), built from 1857 to 1902, which houses the national parliament, government and part of the federal administration, can also be visited.

Albert Einstein lived in a flat at the Kramgasse 49, the site of the Einsteinhaus, from 1903 to 1905, the year in which the Annus Mirabilis papers were published.

The Rose Garden (Rosengarten), from which a scenic panoramic view of the medieval town centre can be enjoyed, is a well-kept Rosarium on a hill, converted into a park from a former cemetery in 1913.

There are eleven Renaissance allegorical statues on public fountains in the Old Town. Nearly all the 16th-century fountains, except the Zähringer fountain, which was created by Hans Hiltbrand, are the work of the Fribourg master Hans Gieng. One of the more interesting fountains is the Kindlifresserbrunnen (Bernese German: Child Eater Fountain), which is claimed to represent a Jew, the Greek god Chronos, or a Fastnacht figure meant to frighten disobedient children.

Bern's most recent sight is the set of fountains in front of the Federal Palace. It was inaugurated on 1 August 2004.

The Universal Postal Union is situated in Bern.

Heritage sites of national significance
Bern is home to 114 Swiss heritage sites of national significance.

It includes the entire Old Town, which is also a UNESCO World Heritage Site, and many sites within and around it. Some of the most notable in the Old Town include the Cathedral which was started in 1421 and is the tallest cathedral in Switzerland, the Zytglogge and Käfigturm towers, which mark two successive expansions of the Old Town, and the Holy Ghost Church, which is one of the largest Swiss Reformed churches in Switzerland. Within the Old Town, there are eleven 16th-century fountains, most attributed to Hans Gieng, that are on the list.

Culture

Theatres
 Bern Theatre
 Narrenpack Theatre Bern
 Schlachthaus Theatre
 Tojo Theater
 The Theatre on the Effinger-Street
 Theatre am Käfigturm

Cinemas
Bern has several dozen cinemas. As is customary in German Switzerland, films are generally in German. Some films in select cinemas are shown in their original language with German and French subtitles.

Film festivals
 shnit International Shortfilmfestival, held annually in early October.
 Queersicht – gay and lesbian film festival, held annually in the second week of November.

Festivals
 BeJazz Summer and Winter Festival
 Buskers Bern Street Music Festival
 Gurtenfestival
 Internationales Jazzfestival Bern
 Taktlos-Festival

Music events
The Musikpreis des Kantons Bern is an annual musical event where "Outstanding musicians which styles shape the Bern music scene" are honored.

Fairs
 Zibelemärit – The Zibelemärit (onion market) is an annual fair held on the fourth Monday in November.
 Bernese Fasnacht (Carnival)

Sports

Bern was the site of the 1954 FIFA World Cup Final, in which West Germany upset the Hungarian Golden Team 3–2. The football team BSC Young Boys is based in Bern at the Stade de Suisse Wankdorf, which also was one of the venues for the 2008 UEFA European Championship, in which it hosted three matches.

FC Breitenrain Bern, founded in 1994, also play in Bern.

SC Bern is the major ice hockey team of Bern which plays in the PostFinance Arena. They compete in the National League (NL), the highest league in Switzerland. The team has ranked highest in attendance for a European hockey team for more than a decade. PostFinance Arena was the main host of the 2009 IIHF Ice Hockey World Championship, including the opening game and the final of the tournament.

PostFinance Arena was also the host of the 2011 European Figure Skate Championships.

Bern Cardinals is the baseball and softball team of Bern, which plays at the Allmend.

Bern Grizzlies is the American football club in Bern and plays in the top level Nationalliga A (American football) at Athletics Arena Wankdorf.

Bern was a candidate to host the 2010 Winter Olympics, but withdrew its bid in September 2002 after a referendum was passed that showed that the bid was not supported by locals. Those games were eventually awarded to Vancouver, British Columbia.

RC Bern is the local rugby club (since 1972) and plays at the Allmend. The ladies team was founded in 1995.

The locality of Bremgartenwald was home to the Bremgarten Circuit, the Grand Prix motor racing course that at one time hosted the Swiss Grand Prix.

Bern Bears is an NGO Basketball Club since 2010 in city of Bern.

The Swiss Grand Prix was held on the Circuit Bremgarten street track from 1950 to 1954, with MotoGP also running their Swiss motorcycle Grand Prix from 1949 to 1954. The circuit eventually fell into disrepair after Switzerland banned motorports after the 1955 Le Mans Disaster, but they made an amendment in 2015 to host electric racing, which is how the Swiss ePrix happened in 2019.

Economy
, Bern had an unemployment rate of 3.3%. , there were 259 people employed in the primary economic sector and about 59 businesses involved in this sector. 16,413 people were employed in the secondary sector and there were 950 businesses in this sector. 135,973 people were employed in the tertiary sector, with 7,654 businesses in this sector.

 the total number of full-time equivalent jobs was 125,037. The number of jobs in the primary sector was 203, of which 184 were in agriculture and 19 were in forestry or lumber production. The number of jobs in the secondary sector was 15,476 of which 7,650 or (49.4%) were in manufacturing, 51 or (0.3%) were in mining and 6,389 (41.3%) were in construction. The number of jobs in the tertiary sector was 109,358. In the tertiary sector; 11,396 or 10.4% were in wholesale or retail sales or the repair of motor vehicles, 10,293 or 9.4% were in the movement and storage of goods, 5,090 or 4.7% were in a hotel or restaurant, 7,302 or 6.7% were in the information industry, 8,437 or 7.7% were the insurance or financial industry, 10,660 or 9.7% were technical professionals or scientists, 5,338 or 4.9% were in education and 17,903 or 16.4% were in health care.

, there were 94,367 workers who commuted into the municipality and 16,424 workers who commuted away. The municipality is a net importer of workers, with about 5.7 workers entering the municipality for every one leaving. Of the working population, 50.6% used public transport to get to work, and 20.6% used a private car.

Education

The University of Bern, whose buildings are mainly located in the Länggasse quarter, is located in Bern, as well as the University of Applied Sciences (Fachhochschule) and several vocations schools.

In Bern, about 50,418 or (39.2%) of the population have completed non-mandatory upper secondary education, and 24,311 or (18.9%) have completed additional higher education (either university or a Fachhochschule). Of the 24,311 who completed tertiary schooling, 51.6% were Swiss men, 33.0% were Swiss women, 8.9% were non-Swiss men and 6.5% were non-Swiss women.

The canton of Bern school system provides one year of non-obligatory kindergarten, followed by six years of primary school. This is followed by three years of obligatory lower secondary school where the pupils are separated according to ability and aptitude. Following the lower secondary pupils may attend additional schooling or they may enter an apprenticeship.

During the 2009–10 school year, there were a total of 10,979 pupils attending classes in Bern. There were 89 kindergarten classes with a total of 1,641 pupils in the municipality. Of the kindergarten pupils, 32.4% were permanent or temporary residents of Switzerland (not citizens) and 40.2% have a different mother language than the classroom language. The municipality had 266 primary classes and 5,040 pupils. Of the primary pupils, 30.1% were permanent or temporary residents of Switzerland (not citizens) and 35.7% have a different mother language than the classroom language. During the same year, there were 151 lower secondary classes with a total of 2,581 pupils. There were 28.7% who were permanent or temporary residents of Switzerland (not citizens) and 32.7% have a different mother language than the classroom language.

Bern is home to 8 libraries. These libraries include; the Schweiz. Nationalbibliothek/ Bibliothèque nationale suisse, the Universitätsbibliothek Bern, the Kornhausbibliotheken Bern, the BFH Wirtschaft und Verwaltung Bern, the BFH Gesundheit, the BFH Soziale Arbeit, the Hochschule der Künste Bern, Gestaltung und Kunst and the Hochschule der Künste Bern, Musikbibliothek. There was a combined total of 10,308,336 books or other media in the libraries, and in the same year a total of 2,627,973 items were loaned out.

, there were 9,045 pupils in Bern who came from another municipality, while 1,185 residents attended schools outside the municipality.

Transport

Public transport 
Bern is served by a dense network of trains, trams, trolleybuses, and conventional motorbuses. The Bern S-Bahn is Switzerland's second busiest.

Bern is the centre of the Libero tariff network, which covers the cantons of Bern and Solothurn and includes the towns of Biel/Bienne, Solothurn, and Thun. The network allows easy and coordinated travel on all modes of public transport, such as trains, PostAuto buses, trams, buses (trolleybuses and motorbuses) and others, regardless of transport operator. Fares are based on the number of zones in a journey. The central part of Bern, (excluding Bümpliz, Betlehem, Bottigen, Brünnen, and Riedbach in the west of the municipality), is part of the fare zone 100.

The city is well served by railways, with the extensive S-Bahn network and many regional and international connections. Bern's central railway station (Bahnhof Bern) is Switzerland's second busiest station (202,600 passengers per working day in 2014), and is the main transport hub in the region.

A funicular railway called the Marzilibahn leads from the Marzili district to the Federal Palace.

Road traffic 
Several Aare bridges connect the old parts of the city with the newer districts outside of the peninsula.

Bern is well connected to other cities by several motorways (A1, A12, A6).

Airport 
Bern Airport (colloquially called Bern-Belp or Belpmoos) located outside the city near the town of Belp, as of March 2021 mostly serves general aviation and charter flights. Zurich Airport, Geneva Airport and EuroAirport Basel Mulhouse Freiburg serve as gateways for air traffic, all reachable in less than two hours by train or car from Bern.

Bicycle transport 
The city has made efforts to make Bern the "bicycle capital" of Switzerland through the creation of better infrastructure, such as dedicated cycle paths.  operates a bike-sharing system.

Notable people

Public servants, the military and the church 
 Conrad Justinger (–1438) – chronicler, magistrate and notary public of the city of Bern
 Johann Jakob Grynaeus (1540–1617) – Protestant divine, a theologian of the school of Huldrych Zwingli 
 Robert Scipio, Freiherr von Lentulus (1714–1786) – military officer, in Austrian and later, Prussian service
 Emmanuel Han (1801–1867) – military officer and philhellene, fought in the Greek War of Independence
 Walter Breisky (1871–1944) – Austrian jurist, civil servant and politician
 Rosalie Dreyer (1895–1987) – naturalized British nurse, pioneer in Britain's public-funded nursing service
 August R. Lindt (1905–2000) – lawyer and diplomat, Chairman of UNICEF 1953–1954 and UN High Commissioner for Refugees 1956–1960 
 Marc Hodler (1918–2006) – lawyer, President of the International Ski Federation 1951–1998, exposed the 2002 Winter Olympic bid scandal
 Hans Urwyler (1925–1994) – Christian minister of the New Apostolic Church
 Kofi Annan (1938–2018 in Bern) – UN Secretary-General 1997–2006
 Algirdas Paleckis (born 1971) – Lithuanian diplomat, politician and columnist

Politicians and the landed gentry 
 Adrian von Bubenberg (–1479) – Bernese knight, military commander and 3-time mayor (Schultheiss) of Bern, hero of the Battle of Murten
 Niklaus Dachselhofer (1595–1670) – Bernese politician, Schultheiss (mayor) of Bern 1636–1667 
 Christoph von Graffenried, 1st Baron of Bernberg (1661–1743) – founder of New Bern, North Carolina
 Susanna Julie von Bondeli (1731–1778) – famous salonist and lady of letters, the salon became the center of intellectual life in Bern. 
 Grand Duchess Anna Feodorovna of Russia (1781 – Elfenau, near Bern 1860) – German princess of the ducal house of Saxe-Coburg-Saalfeld
 Mikhail Bakunin (1814– 1876 in Bern) – Russian revolutionary anarchist. 
 Karl Schenk (1823–1895) – pastor, politician; served on the Swiss Federal Council 1863–1895 
 Vladimir Lenin (1870–1924) – lived in Bern 1914–1917
 Louise Elisabeth de Meuron (1882–1980) – aristocrat and eccentric personality in Bern
 Dom Duarte Pio, Duke of Braganza (born 1945) – claimant to the defunct Portuguese throne, as the head of the House of Braganza
 Regula Rytz (born 1962) – politician, sociologist and historian 
 Ursula Wyss (born 1973) – economist and politician
 Min Li Marti (born 1974), politician, publisher, sociologist and historian

Science and academia 
 Albrecht von Haller (1708–1777) – anatomist, physiologist, naturalist, bibliographer and poet 
 Carl Adolf Otth (1803–1839) – naturalist
 Gustav Heinrich Otth (1806–1874) – mycologist
 Carl Brunner von Wattenwyl (1823–1914) – entomologist who specialised in Orthoptera
 Ludwig Fischer (1828–1907) – botanist, researched phanerogams and cryptogams
 Adolph Francis Alphonse Bandelier (1840–1914) American archaeologist. 
 Emil Theodor Kocher (1841–1917) – physician and medical researcher, received the 1909 Nobel Prize in Physiology or Medicine for work on the thyroid 
 Arnold Klebs (1870–1943) – physician who specialized in the study of tuberculosis
 Anna Tumarkin (1875–1951) – Russian-born, naturalized Swiss academic, the first woman to become a professor of philosophy at the University of Bern
 Albert Einstein (1879–1955) – worked out his theory of relativity while living in Bern, employed as a patent examiner at the patent office
 Ida Hoff (1880–1952) – pioneering doctor, a feminist activist, an early regular female motorist
 Aimé Félix Tschiffely (1895–1954) – Swiss-born, Argentine professor, writer and equestrian adventurer
 Hans Albert Einstein (1904–1973) – Swiss-American engineer and educator, the second child and first son of Albert Einstein
 Friedrich Tinner (born 1937) – nuclear engineer connected with the proliferation of nuclear materials in Iran, Libya, and North Korea
 Claudia Rosiny (born 1960) – German-Swiss academic in Dance and Media studies, a festival director and cultural manager
 Daniel Mojon (born 1963) – ophthalmologist and ophthalmic surgeon, invented minimally-invasive strabismus surgery
 Peter Jüni (born ) - scientific director of the Ontario COVID-19 Science Advisory Table, works at St. Michael's Hospital (Toronto)

Writing and acting 
 Ulrich Boner or Bonerius (early 14th century) – German-speaking Swiss writer of fable
 Hans von Rüte (died 1558) – Bernese dramatist and chronicler of the Swiss Reformation
 Johann David Wyss (1743–1818) – author, best remembered for The Swiss Family Robinson
 Charles Victor de Bonstetten (1745–1832) – liberal writer
 Daniel Albert Wyttenbach (1746–1820) – German Swiss classical scholar
 Johann Rudolf Wyss (1782–1830) – author, writer, and folklorist who wrote the words to the former Swiss national anthem 
 Charles Monnard (1790–1865) – historian and member of the Helvetic Society
 Vincent O. Carter (1924-1983) – American writer, author of The Bern Book 
 Selma Urfer (1928–2013) – author, translator and actress 
 Liselotte Pulver (born 1929) – actress, well known for her hearty and joyful laughter 
 Yves Rénier (1942–2021) – French actor, director, screenwriter and voice actor 
 Lukas Hartmann (born 1944) – children's writer, Switzerland's "first husband" in 2015
 Yang Lian (born 1955) – Swiss-Chinese poet associated with the Misty Poets
 Sibylle Canonica (born 1957) – actress, has appeared in more than forty films since 1981 
 Georges Delnon (born 1958) – theatre director, artistic director and professor
 Sabine Timoteo (born 1975) – actress 
 Yangzom Brauen (born 1980) – actress, activist and writer 
 Cleo von Adelsheim (born 1987) – German-Chilean actress

Artists, painters and musicians 
 Niklaus Manuel Deutsch (–1530) – artist, writer, mercenary and Reformed politician 
 Albrecht Kauw (1621–1681) – still-life painter, cartographer and a painter of vedute
 Gabriel Lory the Elder (1763–1840) – Bernese landscape painter and illustrator
 Ferdinand Hodler (1853–1918) – painter of portraits, landscapes and genre paintings
 Lisa Wenger (1858–1941) – painter and author of children's books
 Adolf Wölfli (1864–1930) – artist associated with Art Brut
 Volkmar Andreae (1879–1962) – conductor and composer
 Eric Blom CBE (1888–1959) – British-naturalised music lexicographer, musicologist, music critic and music biographer 
 Klaus Huber (1924–2017) – composer and academic 
Margrit Zimmermann (born 1927) – pianist, composer, conductor and music educator
 Mani Matter (1936–1972) – singer-songwriter 
 Roland Zoss (born 1951) – songwriter and novelist, lives on the Aeolian Islands
 Christine Lauterburg (born 1956) – singer, yodeler and actress 
 Patricia Kopatchinskaja (born 1977) – Moldovan-Austrian-Swiss violinist
 Zora Slokar, (born 1980) horn player with Orchestra della Svizzera Italiana
 Luca Hänni (born 1994) – singer-songwriter, dancer, and model, Swiss representative at the 2019 Eurovision Song Contest
 Giuseppe Bausilio (born 1997) – actor, dancer, and singer

Business 
 Johann Rudolf Tschiffeli (1716–1780) – agronomist, a wealthy merchant, economist, and lawyer
 Franz Rudolf Frisching (1733–1807) – Bernese patrician, officer, politician, founded the Frisching Faience Manufactory
 Rodolphe Lindt (1855–1909) – chocolate manufacturer, founded the Lindt chocolate factory
 Marianne Alvoni (born 1964) – fashion designer

Sport 

 Elia Alessandrini (1997-2022), a footballer, prospect player for the Switzerland national football team, died from drowning in Oman
 Philippe Marie Eugène, Count d'Ursel (1920–2017) was a Swiss-born Belgian alpine skier and a member of the Ursel family, competed at the 1948 Winter Olympics
 Tanja Frieden (born 1976), a snowboarder and gold medallist at the 2006 Winter Olympics
 Guerino Gottardi (born 1970), a retired Swiss-Italian footballer, almost 250 club caps
 Otto Hess (1878–1926), a pitcher for the Cleveland Bronchos 1902 and 1904–08 and Boston Braves 1912–15
 Maurizio Jacobacci (born 1963), an Italian-Swiss football manager and former player
 Roman Josi (born 1990), a professional ice hockey player, selected to play for Switzerland at the 2010 Winter Olympics
 Arnold Käch (1914–1998), a military officer, skier, ski official and writer
 Christian Kauter (born 1947), a fencer, silver medallist in the team épée at the 1972 Summer Olympics and bronze medallist at the 1976 Summer Olympics
 Dominik Märki (born 1990), a Swiss curler, living in Fayetteville, Arkansas, bronze medallist in the 2018 Winter Olympics
 Jürg Marmet (1927–2013), a mountaineer, part of the first two-man Swiss team which climbed Mount Everest in 1956
 Maja Neuenschwander (born 1980), a long-distance runner who competes in marathon races
 Jennifer Oehrli (born 1989), a football goalkeeper, member of the Switzerland women's national football team
 Mirjam Ott (born 1972), a retired curler, captain of the Swiss Olympic Curling Team
 Markus Ryffel (born 1955), a former long-distance runner, silver medallist in the 5000 metres at the 1984 Summer Olympics
 Akira Schmid (born 2000), professional ice hockey goaltender with the New Jersey Devils of the National Hockey League
 Ernst Schmied (1924–2002), mountaineer, the second successful summiteer of Mount Everest in 1956
 Esther Staubli (born 1979), a football referee, on the FIFA International Referees List since 2006
 Willi Steffen (1925–2005), a former fighter pilot and international footballer, won 28 caps for his country
 Christine Stückelberger (born 1947), a retired equestrian, gold medallist in dressage at the 1976 Summer Olympics compete at six Olympics: 1972, 1976, 1984, 1988, 1996 and 2000. 
 Alain Sutter (born 1968), a footballer, 351 club caps, 58 national team caps

See also
Municipalities of the canton of Bern

Notes and references

Notes

References

External links

 Online camera
 

Bern Public Transportation Website (BernMobil)

 
Gurtenfestival
Buskers Bern

 
1191 establishments in Europe
12th-century establishments in Switzerland
Canton of Bern
Cantonal capitals of Switzerland
Capitals in Europe
Cities in Switzerland
Cultural property of national significance in the canton of Bern
Populated places on the Aare
World Heritage Sites in Switzerland
14th-century establishments in the Old Swiss Confederacy
1350s establishments in the Holy Roman Empire
1353 establishments in Europe
Free imperial cities